Hachborn is a surname. Notable people with the surname include:

Len Hachborn (born 1961), Canadian ice hockey player
Walter Hachborn (1921–2016), Canadian businessman